Tariq Anwar (born 21 September 1945) is an Indian-born British-American film editor whose credits include Center Stage, The Good Shepherd, Sylvia, Oppenheimer, and American Beauty, for which he was nominated for an Academy Award and won two BAFTA Awards. He has also been nominated for an Academy Award in 2011 for editing The King's Speech. He is now based in the United States and the United Kingdom. With Shirley Hills, he is the father of actress Gabrielle Anwar.

Personal life
Anwar was born in Delhi, British India and was raised in Lahore and Bombay. His mother, Edith Reich, was an Austrian Jew, and his father was Indian Muslim film actor and director Rafiq Anwar. He moved with his mother to London after his parents divorced. He is the father of Gabrielle Anwar and Dominic Anwar.

Filmography
Movies
 The Madness of King George (1994)
 The Grotesque (1995)
 The Crucible (1996)
 The Wings of the Dove (1997)
 The Object of My Affection (1998)
 Cousin Bette (1998)
 Tea with Mussolini (1999)
 American Beauty (1999)
 Center Stage (2000)
 Greenfingers (2000)
 Focus (2001)
 Alien Love Triangle (2002)
 Leo (2002)
 Sylvia (2003)
 Stage Beauty (2004)
 American Crude (2005)
 Alpha Male (2006)
 The Good Shepherd (2006)
 Revolutionary Road (2008)
 The Other Man (2008)
 *Hussein Who Said No  (2008-2014)
 Law Abiding Citizen (2009)
 The King's Speech (2010)
 Libertador (2013)
 The Lady in the Van  (2015)
 Our Kind of Traitor (2016)
 Mark Felt: The Man Who Brought Down the White House (2017)
 Dead in a Week Or Your Money Back (2018)
 Farming (2018)
 Human Capital (2019)
 One Night in Miami (2020)
 With/In: Volume 1 (2021)
 With/In: Volume 2 (2021)
 Three Way Week (TBA)
Selected television
 Caught on a Train (1980)
 Oppenheimer (1980)
 Tender Is the Night (1985)
 Fortunes of War (1987)
 Fatherland (1994)

Documentary
 Stephen Fry in America (episodes 1 and 5) (2008)

Awards and nominations

Awards
1980 - BAFTA Television Award for Best Film Editor: Oppenheimer
1999 - BAFTA Film Award for Best Editing: American Beauty

Nominations
1999 - Academy Award for Film Editing: American Beauty
2011 - Academy Award for Film Editing: The King's Speech
2021 - Satellite Award for Best Film Editing: One Night in Miami...

See also
List of film director and editor collaborations

References

External links

1945 births
Best Editing BAFTA Award winners
British film editors
British television editors
Indian people of Austrian-Jewish descent
Indian emigrants to England
Living people
People from Lahore
People from New Delhi
English people of Austrian-Jewish descent
British people of Indian descent
British people of Austrian-Jewish descent